The 2008 Medibank International was a tennis tournament played on outdoor hard courts. It was the 116th edition of the event known that year as the Medibank International, and was part of the International Series of the 2008 ATP Tour, and of the Tier II Series of the 2008 WTA Tour. Both the men's and the women's events took place at the NSW Tennis Centre in Sydney, Australia, from 6 through 12 January 2008.

The men's draw was led by ATP No. 8 and 2007 Mumbai champion Richard Gasquet, 2007 Metz winner Tommy Robredo, and defending champion and recent 2007 Davis Cup titlist James Blake. Other top seeds competing were 2007 Tokyo semifinalist Tomáš Berdych, Chennai semifinalist Carlos Moyá, Lleyton Hewitt, Paul-Henri Mathieu and Fernando Verdasco.

The women's field featured World No. 1 and 2007 WTA Tour Championships titlist Justine Henin, WTA No. 2 and 2007 U.S. Open runner-up Svetlana Kuznetsova, and WTA No. 3 and Beijing finalist Jelena Janković. Also present were 2007 Luxembourg Tier II champion Ana Ivanovic, 2007 U.S. Open semifinalist Anna Chakvetadze, Daniela Hantuchová, Marion Bartoli and Elena Dementieva.

Finals

Men's singles

 Dmitry Tursunov defeated  Chris Guccione, 7–6(7–3), 7–6(7–4)
It was Dmitry Tursunov's 1st title of the year, and his 4th overall.

Women's singles

 Justine Henin defeated  Svetlana Kuznetsova, 4–6, 6–2, 6–4
It was Justine Henin's 1st title of the year, and her 40th overall.

Men's doubles

 Richard Gasquet /  Jo-Wilfried Tsonga defeated  Bob Bryan /  Mike Bryan, 4–6, 6–4, [11–9]

Women's doubles

 Zi Yan /  Jie Zheng defeated  Tatiana Perebiynis /  Tatiana Poutchek,  6–4, 7–6(7–5)

External links
Official website
Men's Singles draw
Men's Doubles draw
Women's Singles, Doubles and Qualifying Singles draw

 
Medibank International, 2008